Black Swarm is a 2007 Canadian suspense film directed by David Winning. Actor Robert Englund plays a mysterious beekeeper who has a secret to hide in the small town of Black Stone. It is the 9th film of the Maneater Series.

Plot
A widow, Deputy Sheriff Jane Kozik, moves from Manhattan to Black Stone, New York, with her nine-year-old daughter Kelsey Kozik. There, she expects to find a safe place to live. The day after moving, a homeless man is found dead in the tool shed of Jane's blind friend Beverly Rowe. Devin Hall and the entomologist Katherine Randell are summoned to help with the investigation. Devin is Jane's brother-in-law and former boyfriend, and Jane still has a crush on him. Meanwhile, Kelsey befriends the scientist Eli Giles, who has developed genetically modified wasps for the army as a weapon, and now he is trying to revert the process. When the wasps attack Black Stone, Jane, Devin and Eli team-up to attempt to destroy the swarm.

Cast
 Sebastien Roberts as Devin Hall
 Robert Englund as Eli Giles
 Sarah Allen as Jane Kozik
 Rebecca Windheim as Kelsey Kozik
 Jayne Heitmeyer as Katherine Randell

Production 
The movie was filmed in Montreal and surrounding small towns in July and August 2007.  It is the 9th film of the Maneater Series.

Release 
It was released on DVD by Genius Entertainment on February 3, 2009.

Reception 
Scott Foy of DreadCentral rated it 3.5/5 and called it "an above average effort from the Sci-Fi Channel that never insults your intelligence even though it does have its fair share of logic gaps."  Laura Burrows of IGN rated it 4/10 and called it "an awful film" with "terrible CGI".  Patrick Bromley of DVD Verdict describes it as having "terrible CGI effects" and "cheesy plotting and non-existent acting".  Justin Felix of DVD Talk called it a "celluloid atrocity", though he stated that it has a "certain Ed Wood B-movie charm to it.".

References

External links

2007 television films
2007 horror films
2000s English-language films
Films directed by David Winning
Maneater (film series)
Sonar Entertainment films
Syfy original films
2007 films
Canadian horror television films
English-language Canadian films
Canadian natural horror films
Films shot in Montreal
Films set in New York (state)
2000s American films
2000s Canadian films